TI BASIC is an ANSI-compliant BASIC programming language interpreter built into the 1979 Texas Instruments TI-99/4 home computer and its improved 1981 version, the TI-99/4A.

In contrast to most BASICs found on contemporary microcomputers, TI BASIC does not trace its history to Microsoft BASIC, but was instead a TI-developed interpreter following the emerging Minimal BASIC standard being created by ANSI and ECMA. This was, in turn, based on the original Dartmouth BASIC from the 1960s. There are a number of differences, sometimes subtle, between TI BASIC and the more common MS varieties.

Minimal BASIC lacks a number of features that are commonly found on contemporary BASICs, and Texas Instruments later introduced the TI Extended BASIC cartridge that enhanced the functionality accessible to BASIC users. This included a wide variety of features found in other BASICs, as well as new system functions for sprite handling, sound, and other features of the platform.

As was common on home computers, TI BASIC was used not only for programming but also as a thin operating system. On top of Minimal BASIC, TI added commands for text, graphics, and basic file operations like recording to tape or any other file system. Due to the specifics of the TI-99 platform, TI BASIC was most notable for its extremely slow performance, roughly half that of common machines, but conversely sported high numerical accuracy.

Performance 
The TI-99 was based on the TMS9900 microprocessor, a 16-bit design that was originally built to provide a single-chip central processing unit (CPU) in low-end models of their TI-990 minicomputer lineup. The TMS9900 was also suitable for use in a microcomputer, but at that time the rest of the support chips required to build a complete computer were invariably 8-bit, and this included TI's wide catalog of such chips. In a minicomputer, 16-bit support systems were built up of many individual chips, but this was not suitable for a low-cost product. TI thus adopted the solution of making the machine mostly 8-bit and connecting the various support chips to this 8-bit bus, with the TMS9900 reading the bus twice to produce a 16-bit value.

The TMS9900's instruction set architecture was based on 16-bit opcodes, meaning that programs would generally be twice as large as they would be on an 8-bit machine. In the era of expensive memory, this presented a significant cost. To address this, TI created an 8-bit virtual machine with its own language or intermediate representation known as the "Graphic Programming Language", or GPL, that allowed programs to be written in a more compact format. The downside to this approach is that every GPL instruction had to be converted on the fly into one or more underlying TMS9900 instructions. The GPL code itself was stored on the 8-bit side of the machine, further slowing its performance.

For all of these reasons, the machine ran far slower than it was theoretically capable of. This was particularly noticeable in BASIC. Every instruction in the user's program had to be read from 8-bit memory, interpreted using code written in GPL, and then output back over the 8-bit bus again. As a result, TI BASIC had poor performance; on common benchmarks of the era, the TI-99 generally ran half as fast as 8-bit machines like the Commodore PET or Apple II. For instance, running the Byte Sieve in BASIC took 3960 seconds in TI BASIC, while the same test in Applesoft BASIC on the Apple II, ostensibly a much slower machine, took 2806 seconds, about 30% faster that the TI.

Elements of TI BASIC

Editing and running
Unlike most BASICs of the era, TI BASIC did not provide a full-screen editor. Instead, a line editor was provided, which allowed the user to add or edit one line at a time. Explicit line numbers were used to order each statement. It used a  prompt to indicate the current new line in immediate mode, as opposed to the more common . Line numbers ranged from 1 to 32767, inclusive, and entering a line outside that range resulted in the "BAD LINE NUMBER" error.

TI BASIC also included a number of debugging commands.  worked something like , stopping execution on certain lines. Unlike , the exit to immediate mode did not occur on the line where  appeared, but on the lines   referred to. For instance,  would cause the program to exit to immediate mode whenever it moved to line 130. This could be used, for example, by inserting a single  at the top of the program to control execution, rather than having to insert it in the middle of the code.  turned off existing breakpoints. Additionally,  printed out the line number of the currently executing line in angle-brackets:  etc, and  turned it off.

Statements 
Most of these operate in the same fashion as their MS counterparts with two additions;  restarts the random number generator at a given "seed" value, and  sets the first entry in arrays to either 0 or 1, whereas MS is always zero-based. To this standard set it added CALL, CLOSE, DISPLAY and OPEN.

In keeping with the Minimal BASIC standard,  statements could only perform branches, they could not perform arbitrary statements as was common in almost every other BASIC of the era. For instance, code such as:

is not valid in TI BASIC. Instead, this would have to be performed using multiple lines:

This can easily lead to off-by-one errors if the conversion is not careful about changing the sense of the boolean comparison. TI BASIC did, however, support the  clause:

The  statement used colons to separate items on different lines, in addition to the more common comma or semicolon. This precluded its use as a statement separator, a concept that TI BASIC did not have. This means a line can have only a single statement. Due to the way BASIC interpreters work, -based loops can be sped up significantly by combining code onto a single line, which avoids having to search through the program for line numbers. This seemingly minor missing feature may result in much slower code, and adding this feature was part of Extended BASIC.

Extensions to the Minimal BASIC system were often not represented directly in BASIC, but were instead accessed via the  command and a series of named GPL-based subroutines. For instance,  clears the screen, and  returns the keycode of the currently pressed key on the keyboard. The language lacked PEEK and POKE so there was no way to create new CALLable code within BASIC, to do this one would require the TI Editor/Assembler, the TI Mini Memory cartridge which included a small assembler, or by using Extended BASIC.

Functions 
   Absolute value
   ASCII numeric value of the first character of a string
   Arctangent
   Convert a number into a string with an ASCII character
   Cosine
   Test whether the end of a file has been reached
   Exponentiation
   greatest integer less than or equal to the parameter
   Length of a string
   Natural logarithm
   First occurrence of a string in another string
   Pseudorandom number generator
   Return a substring of a string
   Sign function
   Sine
   Square root
   Convert a number to a string
   Tangent
   Convert a string to a number

Subprograms 
Subprograms are called with CALL statement (e.g. CALL CLEAR).

 CHAR Definition of graphical characters
 CLEAR Clears the screen
 COLOR Defines foreground- and background color for 8 characters
 GCHAR Reads one character at a specified position from the screen
 HCHAR Writes a character to a screen position and repeats it horizontally
 JOYST Returns the position of the joystick
 KEY Reads from the keyboard without echo on the screen
 SCREEN Changes the color of the screen
 SOUND Creates sounds (using a frequency) and noise
 VCHAR Writes a character to a screen position and repeats it vertically

Extended BASIC

TI BASIC was located in the system's internal ROMs. In 1981, TI released a plug-in ROM cartridge that added additional functions to the existing code, improving the language in a number of ways. Known as Extended BASIC, it was a highly anticipated addition to the platform.

Among the changes was the addition of the ability to have multiple statements on a line. Using multiple statements may improve performance; loops that are implemented in a single line run much faster. Additionally, statements could now span several lines. As the underlying dialect already used the colon for string separators, Extended BASIC used the double-colon for this purpose. Confusingly, as a statement with two colons was also possible in TI BASIC, for instance, which would output "A", a blank line and then "B", so these statements required a space to be added in Extended BASIC, .

In Extended BASIC one could write a simple statement like . This also worked in the  clause, allowing statements like .

The last three statements are used for structured programming, allowing the creation of named subroutines. Extended BASIC also included a number of new functions and especially CALLable routines. Among the latter was a library of sprite commands, including ones that created motion that continued automatically.

Speech synthesis
When equipped with the TI Speech Synthesizer, TI Extended BASIC users could also generate speech from a predefined vocabulary as easily as writing text on-screen.  For example, the following line of text would cause the speech synthesizer to identify the computer:

  CALL SAY("HELLO I AM A #TEXAS INSTRUMENTS# T I NINETY NINE FOUR A HOME COMPUTER") 

Multi-word phrases are delimited with the # symbol, as #TEXAS INSTRUMENTS# in this example. Using a word not included in the speech synthesizer's built-in vocabulary of 338 words and phrases would cause it to slowly spell out the word. TI's Terminal Emulator II cartridge provided text-to-speech functionality.

References

Citations

Bibliography

External links 
 Beginner's BASIC at ClassicCmp.org
 TI-99/4A BASIC Reference Card at ClassicCmp.org

TI-99/4A
BASIC interpreters
Discontinued BASICs
BASIC programming language family